Emmanuel McDonald Bailey (8 December 1920 – 4 December 2013) was a British and Trinidadian athlete, who was born in Williamsville, Trinidad and Tobago. Bailey won a bronze medal in the 1946 Central American and Caribbean Games. He competed for Great Britain in the men's 100 metres at the 1948 Summer Olympics held in London, where he finished sixth and last in the final, and the 1952 Summer Olympics held in Helsinki where he won the bronze medal.

He jointly held the 100 m world record at 10.2 seconds between 1951 and 1956 and won the sprint double seven times at the AAA Championships.
In the 1948/9 season he worked on fitness and speed with Queen's Park Rangers F.C. Who won their first ever promotion that season. From Football League 3rd Division South to Football League 2nd Division.

In 1953 he joined rugby League club Leigh, but he only played in one friendly match for them.

in 1977 Bailey was awarded Trinidad and Tobago's Chaconia Medal (Gold).

Competition record

References

1920 births
2013 deaths
Athletes (track and field) at the 1948 Summer Olympics
Athletes (track and field) at the 1952 Summer Olympics
British male sprinters
Central American and Caribbean Games bronze medalists for Trinidad and Tobago
Central American and Caribbean Games medalists in athletics
Competitors at the 1946 Central American and Caribbean Games
English rugby league players
Leigh Leopards players
Medalists at the 1952 Summer Olympics
Olympic athletes of Great Britain
Olympic bronze medalists in athletics (track and field)
Olympic bronze medallists for Great Britain
Recipients of the Chaconia Medal
Trinidad and Tobago emigrants to the United Kingdom
Trinidad and Tobago male sprinters